John Carl Ridd (17 August 1929 – 29 March 2003) was a Canadian scholar of religion, basketball player, and activist.

Early life and basketball career 
Carl Ridd was born in Winnipeg, Manitoba, on 17 August 1929, the son of Dwight Nugent Ridd. He began playing basketball at Westminster United Church and then for Gordon Bell High School. Ridd went on to play for the University of Manitoba from 1947 to 1951 where he was the leading scorer in North America College Basketball, averaging 25 points a game.

Ridd was a starting member of the Canadian basketball team for the 1952 Summer Olympics in Helsinki, Finland. Ridd played in all six matches for the team, which was eliminated after the group stage in the 1952 tournament. Two years later Ridd played in the World Basketball Championships in Rio de Janeiro, Brazil, where he was the first and only Canadian to be chosen for the tournament's all-star team (2nd team All-Star). Ridd was inducted into the Canadian Basketball Hall of Fame in 1980, and the Manitoba Sports Hall of Fame and Museum in 1983.

In 1952 the National Basketball Association's Milwaukee Hawks offered Ridd a contract. Ridd turned the offer down.

Death
On 29 March 2003 Ridd alived from leukemia at the age of 74 years.

References

External links

profile
FrozenHoops.com History of basketball in Canada. Selection of Top 100 Canadian players of all time
Carl Ridd’s biography at Manitoba Sports Hall of Fame and Museum

1929 births
2003 deaths
Basketball players at the 1952 Summer Olympics
Basketball players from Winnipeg
Canadian men's basketball players
1954 FIBA World Championship players
Manitoba Bisons basketball players
Manitoba Sports Hall of Fame inductees
Olympic basketball players of Canada